Martin Moss may refer to:
 Martin Moss (businessman), British managing director of London department store Woollands
 Martin Moss (American football), American football defensive end